Chairman Mao en Route to Anyuan is a 1967 oil painting by Liu Chunhua. It pictures a young Mao Zedong as one of the common people, ready to take on any obstacle that comes forth. This artwork is a strong example of Chinese communist propaganda and shows the devotion which their culture had to Chairman Mao.

Function 
This artwork served as propaganda during the Cultural Revolution (1967-1976).  During the earlier years of the Cultural Revolution, Liu Chunhua turned to social realism for creating portraits of Mao Zedong. This method allowed for intelligible subjects and emotionally moving themes that targeted the working class.  Chairman Mao aimed to regain his hold after political struggles within his party, and this work focused on the concern of Chairman Mao and the communist party as a way to show the people his goals.

Context 
In 1922 an event called The Anyuan Miners' Strike of 1922 occurred.  This event was a defining moment for the Chinese Communist Party because the miners represented the suffering masses that were the focus of the revolution.  After the nonviolent strike of thirteen thousand workers, a majority of the miners enlisted as soldiers in the Red Army to support Mao and the Revolution.  Nearly half a century later Mao was stuck attempting to correct political fallout from the disasters of the 1950s, including the Great Leap Forward of 1958-1961 .  The Great Leap Forward was an attempt to modernize China and transform it from an agrarian economy to an industrialized, socialist society.  His party had to reinvigorate communist ideology as a whole.  For many years, Mao led China through a time of violent class struggles against traditional customs and capitalism.

Artistic decision making 
In order for Liu Chunhua to create this artwork he studied old photographs and interviewed workers from Anyuan to ensure visual accuracy.  He chose to place Mao in traditional Chinese dress opposed to common wear, as this was normal in portraits of him during the Cultural Revolution.  An unusual aspect of Chunhua's work is the cool color tones he uses.  Warm tones and vibrant red accents were often used in his paintings, however in order to emphasize Mao's determination he chose to use deep blue and purple accents.  Chunhua's alterations of the traditional Chinese landscape suggests that he fully capable of leading the country and that he was almost above the world while still remaining practical.

Liu Chunhua 
Liu Chunhua was born in Tailai, Heilongjiang Province in 1944.  He spent a majority of his childhood focused on art, he attended the Lu Xun Art Academy in Shenyang starting in 1959.  In 1963 he entered the Central Academy of Fine Arts where he painted Chairman Mao en route to Anyuan, which has now been reproduced over 900 million times.  After his graduation he worked as an editor at the Beijing Publishing House before he joined the Beijing Academy.  In 1988, his painting was declared a cultural relic.  Chunhua specializes in oil painting and Chinese painting.

Other 
In November 1969 a copy of Chairman Mao en route to Anyuan, painted by the Italian painter Luigi Carnevali, was hung in the Vatican Press Room in Rome. The image of Mao Zedong had been confused with a missionary priest. Once the error was understood, the picture was removed.

References 

Chiem, Kristen.  Liu Chunhua, Chairman Mao en Route to Anyuan.  Khan Academy.  Retrieved 27 March 2017.
Chiu, Melissa. Chairman Mao en Route to Anyuan .  Annenberg Learner.  Retrieved 27 March 2017.
Liu Chunhua (Biographical Details).  The British Museum.  Retrieved 29 March 2017.
Chairman Mao goes to Anyuan.  V&A Collections.  Retrieved 29 March 2017.
Marcello Colasanti. "Mao Zedong in the Vatican. The curious story of how he ended up alongside Paul VI" 

Chinese paintings
Mao Zedong
1967 paintings